The Wicked Dreams of Paula Schultz is a 1968 DeLuxe Color American comedy film directed by George Marshall and starring Elke Sommer, Bob Crane, Werner Klemperer and Leon Askin. The screenplay concerns an East German athlete who defects to the West by pole-vaulting over the Berlin Wall.

Plot
Paula Schultz (Elke Sommer) has been preparing to compete in the Olympic Games, but instead pole-vaults over the Berlin Wall to freedom in West Germany.

A black-market operator, Bill Mason (Bob Crane), hides her in the home of an old Army buddy, Herb Sweeney (Joey Forman), who now works for the CIA. Bill is willing to hand her over for a price, to either side, so a disappointed Paula returns to East Germany with propaganda minister Klaus instead. At this point, Bill comes to his senses, realizes he loves her, then disguises himself as a female athlete to get Paula back.

Cast
 Elke Sommer as Paula Schultz
 Bob Crane as Bill Mason
 Werner Klemperer as Klaus
 Joey Forman as Herbert Sweeney
 John Banner as Weber
 Leon Askin as Oscar
 Maureen Arthur as Barbara Sweeney
 Theodore Marcuse as Owl (as Theo Marcuse)
 Larry D. Mann as Grossmeyer
 John Myhers as Boss
 Barbara Morrison as Klabfus
 Fritz Feld as Kessel

Production
The film was based on an original screenplay by Ken Englund that Edward Small bought in 1966. Harry Tugend was hired to rewrite it.

Bob Crane was offered the lead role because of his success in Hogan's Heroes, along with three other members of the series, and the film was shot during the show's summer hiatus in 1967. Several other guest stars from the series also appeared in the film.

Paperback novelization

In advance of the film's release, per the practice of the era, Popular Library released a novelization of the screenplay credited to the pseudonym of Alton Harsh (the actual author may have been Al Hine).

Reception
Reviews were poor. Quentin Tarantino appropriated the titular character's name for the title of Chapter 7 ("The Lonely Grave of Paula Schultz") for his film Kill Bill Vol. 2. Tarantino also used the name for the wife of the character Dr. King Schultz (Christoph Waltz) in the film Django Unchained.

See also
 List of American films of 1968
 List of films set in Berlin
 Berlin Wall
 Cold War

References

External links 
 
 
 
 

1968 films
Defection in fiction
Films set in Germany
Films about the Berlin Wall
American sports comedy films
Films about women's sports
Films directed by George Marshall
Films produced by Edward Small
Films scored by Jimmie Haskell
United Artists films
1960s sports comedy films
1968 comedy films
Films about Olympic track and field
Films set in East Germany
Films set in West Germany
1960s English-language films
1960s American films